Oligactis is a genus of South American flowering plants in the tribe Liabeae within the family Asteraceae.

 Species

 formerly included
Oligactis fruticosa (Muschl.) H.Rob. & Brettell- Ferreyranthus fruticosus (Muschl.) H.Rob.

References

 
Asteraceae genera
Flora of South America
Taxonomy articles created by Polbot